Carl Eduard Adolph Gerstaecker (30 August 1828 – 20 June 1895) was a German zoologist, entomologist and professor at the University of Berlin and then the University of Greifswald.

Biography 
Gerstaecker was born in Berlin, where he studied medicine and natural sciences, receiving his PhD in 1855 as a student of Johann Christoph Friedrich Klug. In 1856 he obtained his habilitation for zoology, and soon afterwards, became a curator at the Zoological Museum of Humboldt University. In 1864 he began work as a lecturer at the Landwirtschaftlichen Lehranstalt (Agricultural Educational Facility) in Berlin. In 1874 he became an associate professor for zoology at the University of Berlin, and in 1876, a professor of zoology at the University of Greifswald.  He died in Greifswald.

Works 

 Monographie der Endomychiden (1858) – Monograph on Endomychidae.
 Handbuch der Zoologie (with Wilhelm Peters und Julius Victor Carus), Leipzig (1863-1875).
  (Arthropoda)
 Arthropoda, in Klassen und Ordnungen des Thierreichs, (Section Arthropoda, in classes and orders of the Animals) 1866–93.
 Beitrag zur Insekten-Fauna von Zanzibar. Parts [1]-3. (1866) – Contribution to the insect-fauna of Zanzibar.
 Das Skelet des Döglings Hyperoodon Rostratus (Pont.) Ein Beitrag zur Osteologie der Cetaceen und zur vergleichenden Morphologie der Wirbelsäule, (1887) – The skeleton of the northern bottlenose whale. A contribution to the osteology of cetaceans and the comparative morphology of the spinal column.
 'On The Geographical Distribution and Varieties of the Honey-Bee, with Remarks upon the Exotic Honeybees of the Old World, The Annals and Magazine of Natural History, Zoology, Botany, and Geology (1863) vol.11, no.3, pp. 270-283.

References

External links 
 Adolph Gerstäcker de.Wikisource (bibliography) 
 Zoological Institute of Greifswald University

German entomologists
1828 births
1895 deaths
Scientists from Berlin
Academic staff of the University of Greifswald
19th-century German zoologists